Olof Charles "Olle" Ericsson (1 June 1890 – 25 July 1950) was a Swedish sport shooter who competed in the 1920 and 1924 Summer Olympics. In 1920 he won a bronze medal in the team 300 m military rifle, standing competition. In the 1924 he also participated in the following events:
 Team free rifle – seventh place
 600 m free rifle – 14th place
 50 m rifle, prone – 26th place

Ericsson won several dozen medals in the discontinued 50 and 300 m rifle events at the world championships of 1927–1937.

References

1890 births
1950 deaths
Swedish male sport shooters
ISSF rifle shooters
Olympic shooters of Sweden
Shooters at the 1920 Summer Olympics
Shooters at the 1924 Summer Olympics
Olympic bronze medalists for Sweden
Olympic medalists in shooting
Medalists at the 1920 Summer Olympics
People from Kumla Municipality
Sportspeople from Örebro County
19th-century Swedish people
20th-century Swedish people